Annie Mabel Hodge (5 February 1862–15 October 1938) was a New Zealand teacher and headmistress. She was born in Cheltenham, Gloucestershire, England on 5 February 1862. Hodge established Woodford House, a boarding school, in Havelock North.

References

1862 births
1938 deaths
New Zealand educators
People from Cheltenham
English emigrants to New Zealand